Bailu is a town under the administration of Wuding County, Yunnan, China. , it has 10 villages under its administration.

References 

Township-level divisions of Chuxiong Yi Autonomous Prefecture
Wuding County